Sergei Vladimirovich Khodakov (11 March 1966 – 8 January 2019) was a paralympic athlete from Russia competing mainly in category F12 throwing events.

Early life 
Khodakov was part of the Unified team that travelled to Barcelona for the 1992 Summer Paralympics after the collapse of the Soviet Union. There he won silver medals in both the javelin and shot as well as winning the B2 discus gold medal.  Four years later he travelled with the Russian team to the United States for the 1996 Summer Paralympics where he defended his discus title but could only manage a bronze in the shot and fifth in the javelin.  He competed in a third and final games in Sydney in 2000 where he competed in the shot and discus once again but could not add any further medals.

Sergei Khodakov died in 2019 at 52 years old.

References

External links
Паралимпиец Сергей Ходаков: Мало побеждать — нужны рекорды // Argumenty i Fakty 
 

1966 births
2019 deaths
Paralympic athletes of Russia
Paralympic gold medalists for the Unified Team
Paralympic gold medalists for Russia
Paralympic silver medalists for the Unified Team
Paralympic bronze medalists for Russia
Paralympic medalists in athletics (track and field)
Athletes (track and field) at the 1992 Summer Paralympics
Athletes (track and field) at the 1996 Summer Paralympics
Athletes (track and field) at the 2000 Summer Paralympics
Medalists at the 1992 Summer Paralympics
Medalists at the 1996 Summer Paralympics
Russian male discus throwers
Russian male javelin throwers
Russian male shot putters
Sportspeople from Irkutsk
Visually impaired discus throwers
Visually impaired javelin throwers
Visually impaired shot putters
Paralympic discus throwers
Paralympic javelin throwers
Paralympic shot putters